Ophelia Johanna Nick ( Schily, born 24 January 1973) is a German veterinarian and politician of Alliance 90/The Greens who has been serving as a member of the Bundestag since the 2021 national elections, representing the Mettmann II district. 

In addition to her parliamentary work, Nick has been serving as Parliamentary State Secretary in the  Federal Ministry of Food and Agriculture in the coalition government of Chancellor Olaf Scholz since 2021.

Early life and education
Nick is the daughter of physicians Angela Voith and Konrad Schily. From 1993 to 2000, she studied veterinary medicine at the Free University of Berlin. In 2012, she completed a PhD program at the Ludwig Maximilian University of Munich.

Political career
Nick joined the Green Party in 2010. 

From 2014 to 2018, Nick was part of Green Party’s leadership in North Rhine-Westphalia under its co-chairs Mona Neubaur and Sven Lehmann.

In the negotiations to form a coalition government of the Christian Democratic Union (CDU) and the Green Party under Minister-President of North Rhine-Westphalia Hendrik Wüst following the 2022 state elections, Nick was part of her party’s delegation in the working group on the environment, agriculture and consumer protection.

Other activities
 University of Ulm Medical Center, Member of the Supervisory Board (2012–2016)
 Voith, Member of the Supervisory Board (2010–2017)

Personal life
Nick is married to physician Oliver Nick. The couple has four sons.

References

External links 

 

Living people
1973 births
People from Herdecke
21st-century German politicians
21st-century German women politicians
Members of the Bundestag for Alliance 90/The Greens
Members of the Bundestag 2021–2025
Female members of the Bundestag
20th-century German women